Goyaglycoside is any of several related triterpenoid glycosides found in the fruits bitter melon vine (Momordica charantia), called goya in Okinawan language.  They include:
 goyaglycoside c.
 goyaglycoside d.

Goyaglycosides c and d can be extracted from the fresh fruit with methanol and ethyl acetate.

See also 
 Charantoside
 Karaviloside
 Momordicoside

References 

Triterpene glycosides